Drosophila deflecta is a species of fruit fly in the Drosophila quinaria species group. Larvae are scavengers of Nuphar water lilies.

References

Further reading

 

deflecta
Articles created by Qbugbot
Insects described in 1924